Jayati Ghosh (born 16 September 1955) is an Indian development economist. She is the Chairperson of the Centre for Economic Studies and Planning at the Jawaharlal Nehru University, New Delhi and her core areas of study include international economics, employment patterns in developing countries, macroeconomic policy, and issues related to gender and development.

Early life 
Jayati Ghosh was born on 16 September 1955. Ghosh attended Delhi University for her undergraduate and got her M.A., M. Phil. in economics from Jawaharlal Nehru University. She joined Cambridge University for her PhD after winning the Inlaks Scholarship. Her 1984 doctoral thesis at Cambridge University was entitled The Non capitalist Land Rent: Theories and the Case of North India under the supervision of Dr. Terence J. Byres.

Career
Ghosh has previously held positions at Tufts University and Cambridge University, lecturing meanwhile at academic institutions throughout India. She is one of the founders of the Economic Research Foundation, New Delhi, a non-profit trust devoted to progressive economic research. (Selections of her columns from the Macroscan, the Foundation's outlet, will be published as Tracking the Macroeconomy.) She is also the Executive Secretary of the International Development Economics Associates (IDEAS), a network of economists critical of the mainstream economic paradigm of neo-liberalism.

Ghosh was the principal author of the West Bengal Human Development Report which has received the United Nations Development Programme Prize for excellence in analysis. In addition to her many scholarly articles, she writes regular columns on economics and current affairs for Frontline magazine, Business Line, the Bengali newspaper Ganashakti, Deccan Chronicle, and Asian Age. She also writes a regular column for the fortnightly national magazine Frontline, focusing mainly on economic issues.

In Spring Term 2011, Ghosh served as the first Ragnar Nurkse Visiting Professor in Development Economics at Tallinn University of Technology's Technology Governance graduate program. In 2021, she was appointed to the World Health Organization's Council on the Economics of Health For All, chaired by Mariana Mazzucato. Since 2022, she has been a member of the Commission for Universal Health convened by Chatham House and co-chaired by Helen Clark and Jakaya Kikwete.

Criticisms of the government
Ghosh has consistently maintained a pro-student stance. In February 2016, she accused the NDA government of shutting down student protests against the capital punishment sentence to Afzal Guru. In a lecture enumerating the "anti-national policies of the NDA", she spoke about the importance of student protests and discussion, and the current government's aversion to the demand for transparency and accountability. 

In October 2019, Ghosh expressed her belief that the relay of policymakers who were fixed to political dogmas that discouraged more public spending was dangerous to the economy and destabilizing to society. 

In her co-authored book, Demonetisation Decoded: A critique of India’s monetary experiment, she criticizes the monetary decision taken by the Modi government as an ineffective and wasteful exercise. 

In February of 2020, Ghosh criticized the Modi-led government for misrepresenting data in the 2020 Budget which was presented a month earlier than usual. Claiming that the government did not have data post December 2019, she declared Nirmala Sitharaman's pre-budget speech as ineffectual and inaccurate. She also emphasized the lack of attention given to the need for creation of employment in the new budget, stating that there were cuts in almost every employment-intensive sector.  By withholding information that by constitutional law should be freely available to the public, she said, the Modi government was able to play caste politics.

Awards and recognitions 
Ghosh was conferred International Labour Organisation's Decent Work Research Prize along with Professor Eve Landau in February 2011. 

Other awards include:
 Conference President, Indian Society for Labour Economics, 2013.
 Satyendranath Sen Award, Asiatic Society, Kolkata, 2012.
 ILO Decent Work Research Prize, Geneva, 2010.
 NordSud Prize for Research in Social Sciences, Fondazione Pescarabruzzo, Italy, 2010.
 Ava Maiti Memorial Prize, Asiatic Society, Kolkata 2006.
 UNDP Award for Excellence in Analysis, (for West Bengal Human Development Report), New York 2006.

Personal life
Ghosh is married to Abhijit Sen, an economist who was a member of the disbanded Planning Commission.

Selected bibliography 
 
  Also reprinted January 2008, January 2009, July 2011.
 
 
Edited the forthcoming Economics of the New Imperialism.

See also 
 Feminist economics
 List of feminist economists

References

External links
Faculty profile at Jawaharlal Nehru University
Profile at National Knowledge Commission
Column archive at The Asian Age
Column archive at The Guardian

AP implements Jayati Ghosh suggestions, The Hindu Business Line, 23 September 2006
Jayati Ghosh awarded ILO prize, The Hindu, 12 February 2011
 Videos on YouTube

1955 births
Living people
Bengali people 
Alumni of the University of Cambridge
Feminist economists
Indian columnists
20th-century Indian economists
Indian women columnists
Indian women academics
Jawaharlal Nehru University alumni
Academic staff of Jawaharlal Nehru University
Delhi University alumni
Indian women economists
20th-century Indian women scientists
Indian feminist writers
20th-century Indian women writers
20th-century Indian non-fiction writers
21st-century Indian economists
21st-century Indian women writers
21st-century Indian writers
21st-century Indian non-fiction writers
21st-century Indian women scientists
Women writers from Delhi
Scientists from Delhi
People from New Delhi
Women scientists from Delhi
Women educators from Delhi
Educators from Delhi